Bastián Andree Lizama (born 30 May 1996) is a Chilean badminton player. In 2015, he became the runner-up at the Argentina International tournament partnered with Daniel Humblers of Guatemala. In 2016, he also became the men's doubles runner-up at the Chile International tournament partnered with Iván León.

Achievements

BWF International Challenge/Series 
Men's doubles

  BWF International Challenge tournament
  BWF International Series tournament
  BWF Future Series tournament

References

External links 
 

1996 births
Living people
Chilean male badminton players
21st-century Chilean people